Lakhota Lake is a man made lake situated in center of Jamnagar, Gujarat, India. Lakhota Lake is popularly known as Lakhota Talav or Ranmal Lake. Lakhota Fort is located on a small island in the lake. The lake is located 5 km from Jamnagar Railway Station. It is one of the largest water bodies in Jamnagar city and also among the prime places to visit in Jamnagar.

History 
In the 18th century Lakhota Fort and Lakhota Lake were both built by King Jam Ranmal. The lake is known for being a recreational hub and a tourist spot. It is home to many rare species, including 75 different kinds of birds found in the lake.

See also 

 Jamnagar
 Lists of Lakes in India

References 

Lakes of Gujarat
Jamnagar district